Roger Fauteux (13 December 1923 – 29 April 2021) was a Canadian artist, who was a member of the Quebec artistic dissident group Les Automatistes in the late 1940s. However, he was not a signatory to the group's manifesto, Refus global. Fauteux died in Granby on April 29, 2021, at the age of 97.

See also
Les Automatistes

References

1923 births
2021 deaths
French Quebecers
Artists from Quebec
Canadian abstract artists